2012 Pekan Olahraga Nasional or 2012 National Sports Week was a multi-sport event in Indonesia which was held in Riau from 9–20 September 2012. The previous edition was held in East Kalimantan. Thousands of athletes, officials, and journalists all across of Indonesian provinces participated to the game.

Host selection
Riau won the selection of 2012 Pekan Olahraga Nasional host.

Countdown
365 days before PON will be started, there is an inauguration of 2012 PON countdown timer.  The celebration brought in some famous Indonesian singers, like Iwan Fals, Geisha, Lyla, etc.
The timer is located in the heart of Pekanbaru city, at Jalan Cut Nyak Dien between two iconic buildings, Menara Lancang Kuning and Soeman HS Library. This timer is the very first countdown timer for Pekan Olahraga Nasional events.

Mascot
Bujang Serindit was the name of the mascot. Representation of Burung Serindit (Blue-crowned Hanging Parrot) native birds from Southeast Asia. Bujang Serindit wearing traditional Riau costume.

Venues
Venues for PON 2012 build in 11 city in the Riau.

Pekanbaru

Kampar

Dumai

Pelalawan

Bengkalis

Siak

Kuantan Singingi

Rokan Hulu

Rokan Hilir

Indragiri Hulu

Indragiri Hilir

Opening ceremony
The opening ceremony was scheduled 9 September 2012 but moved to 11 September due to President's schedule. Fireworks attraction started the ceremony, followed by some traditional dances. Judika (Indonesian Idol finalist) sang the theme song of the 2012 PON, Selamat Datang Sang Juara (Welcome the Champions). The athletes' parade then started, Aceh paraded first in the athletes' parade. The parade is organized by alphabetical order, the last team to parade is the veteran athletes from the first PON in Surakarta. 
Then, 8 former national athletes brought the Pekan Olahraga Nasional Flag to the stadium, which is hoisted and followed by a singer singing the PON theme. After the hoisting of the PON flag, Barry Agustini took the Athlete's Oath, while Jefrizal took the Judge's Oath. The last section of the ceremony was the lighting of the PON cauldron. The torch was brought by former athlete Titi Syarif Sudibyo. The torch was passed to Amril Nurman, 5 times PON gold medalist in badminton from Riau. Amril Nurman brought the torch in a replica of Lancang Kuning, which moved through the stadium floor. Amril then passed the torch to a man riding a white horse. The man depicts Tuanku Tambusai, famous hero from Riau. The cauldron was lighted by Zaini Bachtiar, using a spear shaped torch which was thrown to the cauldron. The spear didn't reach the cauldron, but the cauldron is still lit.

The Games

Participating province
Athletes from 33 provincial sports committee are expected to participate.

 Aceh
 Bali
 Bangka Belitung
 Banten
 Bengkulu
 Central Java
 Central Kalimantan
 Central Sulawesi
 East Java
 East Kalimantan
 East Nusa Tenggara

 Gorontalo
 Jakarta
 Jambi
 Lampung
 Maluku
 North Maluku
 North Sulawesi
 North Sumatra
 Papua
 Riau
 Riau Islands

 South East Sulawesi
 South Kalimantan
 South Sulawesi
 South Sumatra
 West Java
 West Kalimantan
 West Nusa Tenggara
 West Papua
 West Sulawesi
 West Sumatra
 Yogyakarta

Sports
The 2012 National Sports Week programme features 32 sports and a total of 44 disciplines.

 Archery
 Athletics
 Badminton
 Baseball
 Basketball
 Billiard and Snooker
 Boxing
 Canoeing/rowing
 Flat water racing
 Traditional boat race
 Cycling
 BMX
 Mountain biking
 Road
 Track

 Diving
 Equestrian
 Fencing
 Field hockey
 Football (details)
 Futsal (details)
 Gymnastics
 Artistic gymnastics
 Rhythmic gymnastics
 Aerobic gymnastics
 Golf
 Judo
 Karate
 Pencak silat
 Sailing

 Shooting
 Softball

 Synchronized swimming
 Sepak takraw
 Table tennis
 Taekwondo
 Tennis
 Volleyball
 Indoor volleyball
 Beach volleyball
 Weightlifting
 Bodybuilding
 Wrestling
 Wushu

Medal table
List of medals in the closing of the games:

References

External links
  Official site

Pekan Olahraga Nasional
Pekan Olahraga Nasional
2012 in Indonesian sport